Eaten Back to Life is the debut studio album by American death metal band Cannibal Corpse. It was released on August 17, 1990 through Metal Blade Records. 

With their debut, Cannibal Corpse sought to further develop the extreme lyrics and imagery of other early death metal bands like Carcass and Death. The cover was created by horror comic book artist Vince Locke, who the band would continue to collaborate with in the future. The violent nature of the subject matter has caused controversy and bans in multiple countries.

The album was recorded at Morrisound Recording in Tampa, Florida, where many other influential early death metal releases were produced. Bassist Alex Webster specifically cited the band's appreciation of albums like Altars of Madness by Morbid Angel and Leprosy by Death as having inspired the choice of studio. They were able to make friends and connections within the burgeoning Tampa death metal scene and would ultimately relocate there.

A statement can be found in the inlay of the album that reads: "This album is dedicated to the memory of Alferd Packer, the first American cannibal (R.I.P.)".

The remastered version includes a video of "Born in a Casket (Live)" as well as a less saturated cover color, a new text scheme for the title, and the Fisher-era Cannibal Corpse text logo.

Track listing
All music written by Cannibal Corpse.

Personnel

Chris Barnes – vocals
Bob Rusay – lead guitar
Jack Owen – rhythm guitar
Alex Webster – bass
Paul Mazurkiewicz – drums

Additional personnel
Glen Benton – backing vocals on "Mangled" and "A Skull Full of Maggots"
Francis H. Howard – backing vocals on "Mangled" and "A Skull Full of Maggots"

References

1990 debut albums
Cannibal Corpse albums
Metal Blade Records albums
Albums produced by Scott Burns (record producer)
Albums recorded at Morrisound Recording
Obscenity controversies in music
Works about Alferd Packer

hu:Tomb of the Mutilated